The 2009–10 Belgian Cup (also known as Cofidis Cup because of sponsoring purposes) was the 55th season of the main knockout football competition in Belgium. It commenced on 25 July 2009 with the first matches of Round 1 and concluded with the Final on 15 May 2010. Genk were the defending champions. The competition was won by Gent.

Competition format
The competition consists of ten rounds. The first seven rounds are held as single-match elimination rounds. If the match remains tied after 90 minutes in the first three rounds, penalties are taken immediately. In rounds four to seven, when tied after 90 minutes first an extra time period of 30 minutes is played followed by penalties if still necessary. The quarter- and semi-finals are played as Two-legged ties, where the team winning both matches on aggregate advances. The final is played as a single match at a neutral venue.

Teams enter the competition in different rounds, based upon their 2008–09 league affiliation. Teams from the fourth-level Promotion or lower begin in Round 1. Third Division teams enter in Round 3, with Second Division teams joining in the following round. Teams from the Belgian First Division enter in Round 6.

Starting Rounds
The starting five rounds feature only teams of lower divisions and all matches are played during the summer and early fall, mostly in July and August.

Round 1
The matches were played on 25 and 26 July 2009.

Round 2
The matches were played on 2 August 2009.

Round 3
The matches were played on 8 and 9 August 2009.

Round 4
The matches were played on 16 August 2009.

|}

Round 5
The matches were played on 23 August 2009.

|}

Final Stages

Bracket

Round 6
The matches were played on 27 and 28 October 2009. All 16 Belgian First Division teams were supposed to enter in this round, however newly promoted Sint-Truiden had to start already in round 4 due to an error by the KBVB-URBSFA. The three teams relegated last season from the top division were also allowed to enter in this round. The top 16 teams of the Belgian First Division 2008–09 are seeded in this round and cannot meet each other. This means that newly promoted Sint-Truiden was not seeded, whereas relegated Dender is.

The draw was made on 2 September 2009.

Round 7
The draw for the seventh round and the quarter finals was made on 4 November 2009. The match between Gent and Germinal Beerschot was originally scheduled one day earlier than the other matches for television broadcasting, but due to snow, the match was rescheduled to also be played on 23 December 2009. One day after this match had been rescheduled, the match between Zulte-Waregem and Cercle Brugge was postponed for the same reason. This match was originally scheduled to be played on 13 January 2010, but was postponed again to 14 January. On 14 January 2010 it was postponed a third time, which proved problematic as the ongoing bad weather had caused the calendar of most teams to be completely full. The next round of the cup was to be played on Wednesday 20 January and with league matches planned during the weekend a creative solution was necessary. This solution came from the Belgian FA who decided on their own to schedule the game on 20 January, with the two-legged quarter final, which was supposed to be played on this date and 27 January, becoming a single leg match. The winner of the rescheduled match was to play Anderlecht on 27 January, in Anderlecht. This decision was much discussed as it was against the rules of the Belgian Cup. After Cercle Brugge and Zulte-Waregem had discussed the case, they decided not to protest against the decision.

Quarterfinals
With the match between Zulte-Waregem and Cercle Brugge postponed three times and not many options remaining, the decision was made by the Belgian Football Association to play the Anderlecht versus Cercle Brugge in just one leg instead of two, with that match being played at Anderlecht. Cercle Brugge protested, insisting that the Belgian Football Association make the rules equal for all teams or they would take the Belgian FA to court. Thus either all matches in the quarter finals were played over one leg or all over two legs, not something in between. With the first legs of the other quarter finals already played, the Belgian FA decided to indeed change the matchup yet again and make the Anderlecht vs. Cercle Brugge match two legs after all.

First legs

Second legs

2–2 on aggregate, Cercle Brugge won on away goals.

3–3 on aggregate, Roeselare won on away goals.

Gent wins 5–1 on aggregate.

Mechelen wins 3–2 on aggregate.

Semifinals
The semi finals are also two-legged. The draw was made on 1 February 2010.

First legs

Second legsGent wins 3–2 on aggregate.Cercle Brugge wins 4–3 on aggregate.''

Final

See also
 Belgian First Division 2009–10

References

External links
 Official site 

2009-10
2009–10 domestic association football cups
2009–10 in Belgian football